This is a list of high schools in the state of Colorado by its county. There are 648 total.

Adams County

Bennett High School, Bennett
Prairie View High School, Henderson

Brighton

Brighton High School
Brighton Heritage Academy
Eagle Ridge Academy
Elmwood Baptist Academy

Commerce City

Adams City High School
Lester R. Arnold High School

Federal Heights

Rocky Mountain Lutheran High School
The Pinnacle Charter School High School

Northglenn

Colorado Virtual Academy
Community Christian
Northglenn High School
Vantage Point High School
Westgate Charter

Strasburg

Prairie Creeks Charter School
Strasburg High School

Thornton

Academy High School
FutureForward at Bollman
Horizon High School
Mapleton Early College High School
Mapleton Expeditionary School Of The Arts
The New America School
North Valley School For Young Adults
Pathways Future Center
Riverdale Ridge High School
Stargate School
Thornton High School
York International

Westminster (Adams County)

Academy of Charter Schools
Belleview Christian School
Cornerstone Christian Academy
Goal Academy
Hidden Lake High School
Life Christian Academy
Mountain Range High School
Westminster High School
Westminster K-12 Virtual Academy

Alamosa County

Alamosa High School, Alamosa
Sangre De Cristo Undivided High School, Mosca

Arapahoe County

Calvary Apostolic Academy, Holly Hills
Deer Trail High School, Deer Trail
Sheridan High School, Sheridan

Aurora

Aurora Central High School
Aurora Science & Tech High School
Aurora West College Preparatory Academy
Cedar Wood Christian Academy - Adams County
Cherokee Trail High School
Colorado Early Colleges Aurora High School
Gateway High School
Grandview High School
Lotus School For Excellence
New Legacy Charter School - Adams County
Options School - Adams County
Overland High School
Rangeview High School
Regis Jesuit High School
Smoky Hill High School
Vanguard Classical School East
Vista Peak 9-12 Preparatory
William C. Hinkley High School
William Smith High School

Byers

Byers High School
Great Plains Academy

Centennial

Arapahoe High School
Eaglecrest High School

Cherry Hills Village

Kent Denver School
St. Mary's Academy

Englewood

Colorado's Finest Alternative High School
Englewood High School
Englewood Leadership Academy
Humanex Academy
The Joshua School

Greenwood Village

Cherry Creek High School
Colorado Provost Academy

Littleton (Arapahoe County)

Heritage High School
Littleton High School
Rock Solid High School

Watkins

Our Lady Help Of Christians Academy
Ridge View Academy Charter School

Archuleta County
Pagosa Springs High School, Pagosa Springs

Baca County

Campo Undivided High School, Campo
Pritchett High School, Pritchett
Springfield High School, Springfield
Vilas Undivided High School, Vilas
Walsh High School, Walsh

Bent County

Las Animas High School, Las Animas
McClave High School, McClave

Boulder County

Nederland High School, Nederland
Niwot High School, Niewot
Monarch High School, Louisville
Lyons High School, Lyons

Boulder

Arapahoe Ridge High School
Boulder Explore
Boulder High School
Boulder Prep Charter High School
Boulder TEC
Boulder Universal Online School
Fairview High School
Halcyon School
Hillside School
Mountain Shadows Montessori School
New Vista High School
September School
Shining Mountain Waldorf School
Tara Performing Arts High School
Watershed School

Longmont

Desiderata School
Faith Baptist School
Longmont Christian School
Longmont High School
Mead High School
Messiahville Baptist Academy
Olde Columbine High School
Silver Creek High School
Skyline High School
St. Vrain Global Online Academy
Twin Peaks Charter Academy

Lafayette

Alexander Dawson School
Catalyst High School
Centaurus High School
Justice High Charter School
Peak To Peak Charter School

Broomfield County

Broomfield
Broomfield High School
Holy Family High School
Legacy High School
Prospect Ridge Academy

Chaffee County

Buena Vista

Buena Vista High School
Buena Vista Online Academy
Chaffee County High School
Darren Patterson Christian Academy
The Link School

Salida

Horizons Exploratory Academy
Salida High School

Cheyenne County

Cheyenne Wells High School, Cheyenne Wells
Kit Carson High School, Kit Carson

Clear Creek County

Clear Creek High School, Evergreen

Conejos County

Antonito High School, Antonito
Sanford High School, Sanford

La Jara

Centauri High School
La Jara Second Chance School

Costilla County

Centennial High School, San Luis
Sierra Grande High School, Blanca

Crowley County
Crowley County High School, Ordway

Custer County

Custer County High School, Westcliffe

Delta County

Hotchkiss High School, Hotchkiss
Paonia High School, Paonia

Cedaredge

Cedaredge High School
Surface Creek Vision School

Delta

Delta County Opportunity School
Delta County Virtual Academy
Delta High School
Delta Vision School
North Fork Vision School

Denver County (City of Denver)

Special-Focus

Denver Center for International Studies (Ford, Montbello)
Denver School of the Arts
Denver School of Innovation and Sustainable Design
DSST Public Schools (Byers, Cole, College View, Conservatory Green, Green Valley Ranch, Montview)
Emily Griffith Technical College
Girls Athletic Leadership High School
Kunsmiller Creative Arts Academy
Noel Community Arts School
Robert F. Smith STEAM Academy
Rocky Mountain School Of Expeditionary Learning

Early Colleges

Northeast Early College
CEC Early College
Dr. Martin Luther King, Jr. Early College

Public/Magnet/Charter

5280 High School
Abraham Lincoln High School
Academy Of Urban Learning
Bruce Randolph School
Collegiate Preparatory Academy
Colorado High School Charter
Compassion Road Academy
Contemporary Learning Academy High School
DELTA High School
Denver Center for 21st Learning At Wyman
Denver Justice High School
Denver Montessori Junior/Senior High School
Denver Online High School
East High School
Excel Academy-Denver
Florence Crittenton High School
George Washington High School
Global Leadership Academy - Mapleton Public Schools
John F. Kennedy High School
KIPP (Denver Collegiate High School, Northeast Denver Leadership Academy
Legacy Options High School
Manual High School
Montbello High School
North High School
Northfield High School
PREP Academy
Respect Academy
RiseUp Community School
South High School
STRIVE Prep (RISE, SMART Academy)
Summit Academy
Thomas Jefferson High School
Vista Academy
West High School

Private/Religious

Accelerated Schools
Arrupe Jesuit High School
Augustine Classical Academy
Beth Jacob High School
Bishop Machebeuf Catholic High School
Change Christian Academy
Colorado Academy - Jefferson County
Denver Academy
Denver Academy of Torah
Denver Christian Schools
Denver Jewish Day School
Denver Waldorf School
Mile High Adventist Academy
Mullen High School
Yeshiva Toras Chaim

Dolores County
Dove Creek High School, Dove Creek

Douglas County

Castle Rock

Castle View High School
Daniel C Oakes High School
Douglas County High School

Highlands Ranch

Eagle Academy
Highlands Ranch High School
Japanese School Of Denver
Mountain Vista High School
Rock Canyon High School
Skyview Academy
STEM School Highlands Ranch
Thunderridge High School
Valor Christian High School

Parker

Chaparral High School 
Legend High School
Lutheran High School
Ponderosa High School

Eagle County

Vail Mountain School, Vail
Vail Ski And Snowboard Academy, Minturn
World Academy, Eagle

Edwards

Battle Mountain High School
Red Canyon High School
Vail Christian School

Gypsum

Eagle Valley High School
New America Charter School

Elbert County

Elbert High School, Elbert
Kiowa High School, Kiowa
Simla High School, Simla

Elizabeth

Elizabeth High School
Frontier High School

El Paso County

Calhan High School, Calhan
Ellicott Senior High School, Ellicott
Manitou Springs High School, Manitou Springs
Miami-Yoder High School, Rush

Colorado Springs Private/Religious

Colorado School for the Deaf and Blind
The Colorado Springs School
Colorado Springs Christian Schools
Evangelical Christian Academy
Fountain Valley School Of Colorado
Pikes Peak Christian School
Rocky Mountain Montessori Academy
St Mary's High School
The University School

Academy SD-20 Colorado Springs

Air Academy High School, USAF Academy
Aspen Valley High School
The Classical Academy
Discovery Canyon Campus School
Liberty High School
Pine Creek High School
Rampart High School

Colorado Springs SD-11

Achieve Online School
The Bijou School
CIVA Charter High School
Colorado Early Colleges Colorado Springs
Community Prep Charter School
Coronado High School
Doherty High School
Eastlake High School
Mitchell High School
Odyssey Early College/Career Options
Palmer High School
Pikes Peak Prep
Tesla Educational Opportunity School
Thomas MacLaren State Charter School (within district borders)

Falcon SD-49 (Colorado Springs)

Banning Lewis Academy
Sand Creek High School
Vista Ridge High School
Pikes Peak Early College
Power Technical Early College
Rocky Mountain Classical Academy
Springs Studio for Academic Excellence

Falcon SD-49 (Falcon)

Falcon Virtual Academy
Liberty Tree Academy
Pikes Peak School of Expeditionary Learning

Falcon SD-49 (Peyton)

Falcon High School
Patriot High School
Peyton Senior High School

Fountain-Fort Carson SD-8

Welte Education Center
Fountain-Fort Carson High School

Harrison SD-2

Atlas Preparatory Academy
Harrison High School
James Irwin Charter High School
Sierra High School
The Vanguard School

Monument

Lewis-Palmer High School
Palmer Ridge High School

Other Districts

Cheyenne Mountain High School, Colorado Springs Cheyenne Mountain SD-12
Hanover Junior-Senior High School, Colorado Springs Hanover SD-28

Widefield SD-3

Mesa Ridge High School, Colorado Springs
Discovery High School
Widefield High School

Yoder

Edison Academy
Edison High School

Fremont County
Cotopaxi High School, Cotopaxi

Cañon City

Calvary Christian School
Canon City High School
Canon Online Academy

Florence

Florence Christian School
Florence Junior/Senior High School

Garfield County

Grand Valley High School, Parachute
Rifle High School, Rifle

Carbondale

Bridges High School
Colorado Rocky Mountain School
Roaring Fork High School

Glenwood Springs

Glenwood Springs High School
Yampah Mountain High School

New Castle

Coal Ridge High School
Liberty Classical Academy

Gilpin County 

Gilpin County Undivided High School, Black Hawk

Grand County

Grand County Christian Academy, Tabernash
Middle Park High School, Granby
West Grand High School, Kremmling

Gunnison County

Crested Butte Community School, Crested Butte
Gunnison High School, Gunnison
Marble Charter School, Marble

Hinsdale County
Lake City Community School, Lake City

Huerfano County

John Mall High School, Walsenburg
La Veta High School, La Veta

Jackson County
North Park High School, Walden

Jefferson County

Columbine High School, Columbine
Conifer High School, Conifer
Dakota Ridge High School, Dakota Ridge
Evergreen High School, Evergreen
Jefferson Academy Charter School, Broomfield
Jefferson High School, Edgewater

Arvada

Arvada High School
Arvada West High School
Early College Of Arvada - Adams County
Excel Academy
Faith Christian Academy
Pomona High School
Ralston Valley High School
Warren Tech North

Golden

Compass Montessori School
Connections Learning Center
Golden High School
Jeffco Virtual Academy
Rocky Mountain Deaf School

Lakewood

Alameda International Junior/Senior High School
Bear Creek High School
Brady Exploration School
D'Evelyn Junior/Senior High School
Denver Street School
Green Mountain High School
Jefferson County Open School
Lakewood High School
Long View High School
The Manning School
McLain High School
New America School
Sobesky Academy
Warren Tech

Littleton (Jefferson County)

Chatfield High School
Collegiate Academy Of Colorado
Front Range Christian School

Westminster (Jefferson County)

Hyland Christian School
Standley Lake High School

Wheat Ridge

Beth Eden Baptist School
Wheat Ridge High School

Kiowa County

Eads High School, Eads
Plainview High School, Sheridan Lake

Kit Carson County

Bethune High School, Bethune
Burlington High School, Burlington
Flagler Senior High School, Flagler
High Plains Undivided High School, Seibert
Stratton Senior High School, Stratton

La Plata County

Bayfield High School, Bayfield
Ignacio High School, Ignacio

Durango

Animas High School
Colorado Timberline Academy
Durango High School
Durango Big Picture High School
Grace Preparatory Academy Of Durango
Southwest Colorado eSchool

Lake County

Leadville

High Mountain Institute
Lake County High School

Larimer County

Berthoud High School, Berthoud

Estes Park

Eagle Rock School
Estes Park High School
Estes Park Options School

Fort Collins

Centennial High School
Colorado Early College Fort Collins
Fort Collins High School
Fort Collins Montessori School
Fossil Ridge High School
Front Range Baptist Academy
Heritage Christian Academy
Liberty Common High School
Polaris Expeditionary Learning School
Poudre Community Academy
Poudre High School
PSD Global Academy
Ridgeview Classical Charter Schools
Rocky Mountain High School

Loveland

Harold Ferguson High School
Leap School
Loveland Classical School
Loveland High School
Mountain View High School
Resurrection Christian School
Thompson Online School
Thompson Valley High School

Las Animas County

Aguilar High School, Aguilar
Branson Undivided High School, Branson
Kim Undivided High School, Kim
Primero Junior-Senior High School, Weston

Trinidad

Hoehne High School
Holy Trinity Academy
Trinidad High School

Lincoln County

Genoa-Hugo High School, Hugo
Karval Junior-Senior High School, Karval
Limon High School, Limon

Logan County

Caliche High School, Iliff
Fleming High School, Fleming
Merino High School, Merino
Peetz High School, Peetz

Sterling

Smith High School
Sterling High School

Mesa County

De Beque Undivided High School, De Beque
Fruita Monument High School, Fruita
Gateway School, Gateway
Palisade High School, Palisade

Collbran

Grand Mesa High School
Plateau Valley High School

Grand Junction

Caprock Academy
Central High School
Grand Junction High School
Grand River Virtual Academy
Landmark Baptist School
Life Academy
Pear Park Baptist School
R-5 High School

Mineral County
Creede High School, Creede

Moffat County
Moffat County High School, Craig

Montezuma County

Dolores High School, Dolores
Mancos High School, Mancos

Cortez

Lighthouse Christian Academy
Montezuma-Cortez High School
Southwest Open Charter School

Montrose County

Nucla High School, Nucla
Olathe High School, Olathe

Montrose

Montrose High School
Peak Virtual Academy
Vista Charter School

Morgan County

Brush High School, Brush
Weldon Valley High School, Weldona
Wiggins High School, Wiggins

Fort Morgan

Fort Morgan High School
Lincoln High School

Otero County

Cheraw High School, Cheraw
Fowler High School, Fowler
La Junta High School, La Junta
Manzanola High School, Manzanola
Rocky Ford Junior Senior High School, Rocky Ford
Swink High School, Swink

Ouray County

Ouray High School, Ouray
Ridgway High School, Ridgway

Park County

Platte Canyon High School, Bailey
South Park High School, Fairplay

Phillips County

Haxtun High School, Haxtun
Holyoke Senior High School, Holyoke

Pitkin County

Aspen High School, Aspen
Basalt High School, Basalt

Prowers County

Granada Undivided High School, Granada
Holly High School, Holly
Lamar High School, Lamar
Wiley High School, Wiley

Pueblo County

Pueblo County High School, Vineland 
Rye High School, Rye

Pueblo

Centennial High School
Central High School
Chavez/Huerta K-12 Preparatory Academy
East High School
South High School
Pueblo School for Arts and Sciences
St Therese Catholic School

Pueblo West

Pueblo West High School
Southern Colorado Early College

Rio Blanco County

Meeker High School, Meeker
Rangely High School, Rangely

Rio Grande County
Del Norte High School, Del Norte

Monte Vista

Byron Syring Delta Center
Monte Vista High School
Monte Vista Online Academy
Sargent Senior High School

Routt County

Hayden High School, Hayden
Soroco High School, Oak Creek

Steamboat Springs

Steambout Mountain School
Steamboat Springs High School
Yampa Valley School

Saguache County

Crestone Charter School, Crestone
Moffat Senior High School, Moffat
Mountain Valley Senior High School, Saguache

Center

The Academic Recovery Center of San Luis Valley
Center High School
Center Virtual Academy

San Juan County
Silverton High School, Silverton

San Miguel County

Norwood High School, Norwood

Telluride

Telluride High School
Telluride Mountain School

Sedgwick County

Julesburg High School, Julesburg
Revere High School, Ovid

Summit County

Frisco

Snowy Peaks High School
Summit High School

Teller County

Cripple Creek-Victor Junior/Senior High School, Cripple Creek
Woodland Park High School, Woodland Park

Washington County

Akron High School, Akron
Arickaree School, Anton
Woodlin Undivided High School, Woodrow

Otis

Lone Star School
Otis High School

Weld County

Briggsdale Undivided High School, Briggsdale
Eaton High School, Eaton
Erie High School, Erie
Fort Lupton High School, Fort Lupton 
Frederick High School, Frederick
Highland High School, Ault
Pawnee High School, Grover
Platte Valley High School, Kersey 
Prairie High School, Raymer
Roosevelt High School, Johnstown
Severance High School, Severance
Valley High School, Gilcrest
Weld Central Senior High School, Keenesburg
Windsor High School, Windsor

Greeley

Centennial BOCES High School
Dayspring Christian Academy
Early College Academy
Frontier Charter Academy
Greeley Alternative Program
Greeley Central High School
Greeley West High School
Jefferson High School
Northridge High School
Union Colony Preparatory
University Schools

Yuma County

Idalia High School, Idalia
Liberty High School, Joes 
Wray High School, Wray
Yuma High School, Yuma

See also

Education in Colorado
List of Colorado high schools without a Wikipedia article
Table of Colorado charter schools
Table of Colorado school districts

References
http://high-schools.com/directory/co/counties/

External links
 http://high-schools.com/directory/co/counties/

 
Colorado
High schools